The 2021–22 Arizona State women's basketball team represented Arizona State University during the 2021–22 NCAA Division I women's basketball season. The Sun Devils were led by twenty fifth-year head coach Charli Turner Thorne (who retired at the end of the season). and they played their home games at the Desert Financial Arena and competed as members of the Pac-12 Conference.

Previous season
The Sun Devils finished the season 20–11, 10–8 in Pac-12 play to finish in sixth place. They advanced to the first round of the Pac-12 women's tournament where they lost to California.  The NCAA tournament and WNIT were cancelled due to the COVID-19 pandemic.

Offseason

Departures 
Due to COVID-19 disruptions throughout NCAA sports in 2020–21, the NCAA announced that the 2020–21 season would not count against the athletic eligibility of any individual involved in an NCAA winter sport, including women's basketball. This meant that all seniors in 2020–21 had the option to return for 2021–22.

Incoming

Roster

Schedule

|-
!colspan=12 style=| Regular season

|-
!colspan=12 style=| Pac-12 Tournament

Source:

Rankings

*The preseason and Week 1 polls were the same.^Coaches did not release a Week 2 poll.

See also
2021–22 Arizona State Sun Devils men's basketball team

References

Arizona State Sun Devils women's basketball seasons
Arizona State
Arizona State Sun Devils women's basketball
Arizona State Sun Devils women's basketball